Munc-18 (an acronym for mammalian uncoordinated-18) proteins are the mammalian homologue of UNC-18 (which was first discovered in the nematode worm C. elegans) and are a member of the Sec1/Munc18-like (SM) protein family. Munc-18 proteins have been identified as essential components of the synaptic vesicle fusion protein complex and are crucial for the regulated exocytosis of neurons and neuroendocrine cells.

Function
Munc-18 binds syntaxin and forms a syntaxin/munc-18 complex which is thought to precede and/or regulate vesicle priming, a process mediated by VAMP, SNAP-25 and syntaxin. Munc18-1, a member of the SM family, has multiple roles in exocytosis. It directly promotes syntaxin stability and either controls the spatially correct assembly of core complexes for SNARE-dependent fusion, or acts as a direct component of the fusion machinery through the interaction with SNARE core. Munc18a, which binds specifically to the N-terminal of syntaxin, causes a conformation change, activating syntaxin, which in turn connects to the ternary-SNARE complex. Deletion of munc18-1 leads to a defect in secretory vesicle docking. Furthermore, the munc18-1 deficient mouse is the first mouse model wherein neurotransmitter secretion is completely absent.  This mouse model is appropriately titled the "silent mouse."

Mechanism
This outline below presents a broad modeling of how Munc-18 is thought to play a role in vesicle docking and fusion, allowing for intentional exocytosis. As it is a combined preliminary modeling, more research is necessary to fully understand the role of Munc-18 in this process.
Munc18-1 binds to a closed form of syntaxin-1, blocking SNARE complex formation. This is thought to affect vesicle docking
Munc13 opens syntaxin-1, Munc18-1 is translocated to the SNARE complex, which releases the inhibitory effect, allowing assembly (specifically of the alpha helix 4 part bundle)
It is thought that Munc18-1 stabilizes the formed trans-SNARE complex, preventing its dissociation
The SNARE complex, potentially with the assistance of Munc-18 brings the membranes together and causes fusion

It has also been shown in one study that Munc-18 binds to the C-terminus of synaptobrevin, suggesting that this protein plays an important role in membrane fusion.

Family members 
The following is a list of human munc-18 proteins:

See also 
Vesicle fusion
Exocytosis
Syntaxin
SNARE

References

External links
 

Neurophysiology
Human proteins